Abdul Manaf Nurudeen (born 8 February 1999) is a Ghanaian professional footballer who plays as a goalkeeper for Belgian Pro League club Eupen and the Ghana national team.

Club career
As a youth player, Manaf Nurudeen joined the Senegalese Aspire Academy.

In 2017, he signed for Eupen in Belgium. On 7 November 2020, he debuted for Eupen during a 1–1 draw with Waasland-Beveren.

Manaf Nurudeen wears a goalkeeper helmet.

International career
Manaf Nurudeen represented Ghana at the 2019 Africa U-20 Cup of Nations.

He was first called up to the Ghana national team in September 2021 for the World Cup qualifiers against Ethiopia and South Africa, and remained on the bench in these games.

Nurudeen was part of the Ghanaian team in the 2021 Africa Cup of Nations that was eliminated at the group stage of the competition. He debuted with Ghana in a 3–0 friendly loss to Algeria on 5 January 2022.

Career statistics

References

External links
 
 

Living people
1999 births
Footballers from Accra
Ghanaian footballers
Ghana international footballers
Ghana under-20 international footballers
Association football goalkeepers
Belgian Pro League players
K.A.S. Eupen players
Ghanaian expatriate footballers
Ghanaian expatriate sportspeople in Belgium
Expatriate footballers in Belgium
2022 FIFA World Cup players